This is a list of all United States Supreme Court cases from volume 501 of the United States Reports:

External links

1991 in United States case law